The Dreamstone is a British animated television series that ran for four series, with 13 episodes per series between 1990 and 1995. The original concept and artwork were created by Michael Jupp, and the series was written by Sue Radley and Martin Gates. The series was produced by Martin Gates Productions (MGP) for a wholly-owned subsidiary of Central (a part of Independent Television) and Filmfair. All the current distribution rights for the Martin Gates catalogue are owned by Monster Entertainment.

The Dreamstone is set in an alternative world of Two Realms, One is called "The Land of Dreams" and one is called "The Land of Nightmares", and concerns itself principally with the struggle between good (personified by The Dream Maker, a Merlin-esque white magician), and evil (personified by Zordrak, Lord of Nightmares).

Principal characters

Land of Dreams
The Land of Dreams is populated by Noops (the humanoids of the land, who live and work like humans) and Wuts (the defenders of the land, who fly around on leaves and use staffs with orbs of light attached to both communicate and ward off Zordrak's evil forces).

The Dream Maker (voiced by John Franklyn-Robbins): Wise, kind, and very old. He floats six inches off the ground instead of walking, claiming it is "less tiring for the feet." He carries the responsibility of creating and sending dreams to the whole world. In early episodes, the Dream Maker was a more frail and befuddled eccentric (with his guard dogfish Albert usually showing the greater clarity of the two), though his personality alters into a more straight-laced and dignified authority figure later on.
Albert (voiced by Richard Tate): The Dream Maker's pet dogfish. The story goes that the Dream Maker saw Albert in a dream, and liked him so much he decided to make him real. Albert swims in the air rather than water, and his personality is that of a loyal dog. Albert later became the mascot/logo for Martin Gates' production company.
Rufus (voiced by Stuart Lock): A Noop who enjoys dreaming so much that he has vivid daydreams, which means he has trouble holding a job. After being fired from the waxworks in the first episode, Amberley suggests Rufus apply to be the Dream Maker's assistant, as he is perfectly qualified for it because of his constant daydreaming. Though Rufus lets his mind wander sometimes, and has a tendency to play around with things he should not, he has a hidden creative mindset inside his spacey demeanour. Rufus is the main protagonist of the series, and often saves the day via bravery, resourcefulness, or sheer dumb luck.
Amberley (voiced by Nancy Hendry): Rufus's best friend, Amberley is practical and resourceful and generally more lucid and responsible than Rufus. She is good at climbing drainpipes, jumping out of windows, and is an ace leaf-flier. Her level-headedness is sometimes clouded by her short temper, however, which sometimes leads to her rushing into situations and getting captured. She was named after Amberley, West Sussex, a village creator Mike Jupp used to visit regularly.
Pildit (voiced by Derek Wright): The leader of the Wuts and the Dream Maker's most trusted ally, he is often called upon to defend the Land of Dreams from Zordrak's forces. He and the Dream Maker are old friends and often help support each other. It is Pildit that teaches Rufus and Amberley how to use the special leaves the Wuts use to fly. Pildit is rather mellow and deadpan in terms of personality, a stark contrast to his grandmother.
 Wildit (voiced by Jacqueline Clarke): Pildit's grandmother. The hearty and fearless leader of the Wut Flying Squadron, she is as handy in a fight as her grandson. She has something of a crush on the Dream Maker. She is quite an eccentric character and tends to act younger than her years.
Spildit (voiced by Ellie Beaven): Wildit's niece. A hyperactive and very talkative little female Wut who is prone to getting herself in trouble. She has a friendly rivalry with the Urpneys, often taking pity on them during their less antagonistic moments or even obliviously assisting with their schemes.
Mr. Blossom (voiced by Anthony Jackson): The Dream Maker's gardener. An elderly Wut for whom the garden takes precedence over everything, including the Dreamstone being stolen and the end of the world. He works hard and complains constantly, often due to acting as collateral damage to the ongoing feud.
Wottles (voiced by Ellie Beaven): The Wottles look very similar to Wuts, only they are much smaller and cuter and have furry chests. Their job is to look after the Dream Bottle trees from underground to make sure they are healthy. Two Wottles who often join Rufus and Amberley in their adventures are called "Hat" and "Egg".
Planet Dreamstone (voiced by Jacqueline Clarke): The planet itself seems to be a sentient being, able to talk to other characters. It speaks with a gentle, female voice, and is also a figure of authority in the Council of Dreammakers. Being the source of power for all Dreamstones in the universe, the planet is very powerful and actually fights with Zordrak in the episode "Megattack".

Land of Nightmares

The Land of Nightmares, also known as the dark side of the planet, is populated mostly by Urpneys, who resemble lizard-like human beings. They live in Viltheed, a tall black mountainous wasteland in which resides Zordrak. Although all the Urpneys in Viltheed are male, female Urpneys do exist, as Urpgor has both an auntie and a niece.

Zordrak (voiced by Gary Martin): The Lord of Nightmares and the principal antagonist of the series. He resembles a large dragon and is characterized by a deep, demonic voice. He stands at least a hundred feet high, and spends much of his time sitting on his throne dispensing punishment to wayward Urpneys. Zordrak was once a Dream Maker himself. He was ejected from the council for corrupting dreams into nightmares, when the council ejected him he transformed himself into his current form and landed in Viltheed where he remains vowing vengeance on the Dream Maker. His fearsome appearance is a sharp contrast with the simple cartoon-like style of his Urpney henchmen. While not physically disabled, he very rarely moves from his throne, and can transform into a mist/apparition in order to leave Viltheed. While playing a palpable role in Series One, concocting plans or even taking direct involvement, his role slightly diminishes in later series in favour of the Urpneys playing the main antagonists. His initial motive for stealing the stone is so he could freely send nightmares to the Sleeping World, but he later reveals his intention to use its powers to make himself Lord of the Universe. In Mike Jupp's original draft of the story, Zordrak was known as "Nasta Shelfim", which was an anagram for "Satan himself", the character was changed to Zordrak due to the original name being too dark.
Urpgor (voiced by Leonard Whiting (Series 1–3), Colin Marsh (Series 4)): The chief Urpney scientist. For reasons that are never explained, he has green skin, pink mohican-style hair and orange eyebrows. He habitually wears a white lab coat and three pairs of glasses on the end of his nose. He is also completely mad and is often seen insanely bounding around, having fallen in love with his latest invention. He publicly hates the other Urpneys, and secretly covets Zordrak's throne. On the whole his inventions always work but are often let down by their extreme Heath Robinson complexity and reliance on Urpney muscle power to operate them. Although he starts the series with a minor role, he appears in every episode except the first half of the opening special, with several episodes centred around the character. He is the only Urpney shown to have relatives, having an aunt that appears in two episodes and a niece (Urpip) that appears in another.
Sergeant Blob (voiced by Richard Tate): Exploited, gung ho, and not very bright, he is the obese military leader of the Urpneys, who takes over Operation Dreamstone after the former commanding officer, Captain Crigg, is executed at the start of the first episode. He usually has Nug and Frizz accompany him on missions, having appointed them his "elite squad" in the pilot episode because they were too slow to run off with the others. 
Corporal Frizz (voiced by Melvyn Hayes): An Urpney whose cowardice knows no bounds. He finds himself in a position of responsibility simply because he could not run away as fast as the others. He would much rather be at home with some sandwiches than fighting deadly Noops. He was voiced by Melvyn Hayes, who played a similar character in the sitcom It Ain't Half Hot Mum. A recurring device in the series is that, at the end of each episode, Frizz speaks the final lines. This occurs in all but five episodes. In the first series, he wears glasses, but these disappear in the second series. He dislikes Urpgor more than the other Urpneys, and on a few occasions tries to attack him (notably after meeting Urpgor's aunt).
Corporal Nug (voiced by Anthony Jackson): Another of Blob's cowardly Urpney squad (if not to the same neurotic levels as Frizz). Though Nug can often come across as rather dopey and vacuous in demeanour, he sometimes shows himself to be more perceptive than the other Urpneys, sometimes suggesting good ideas, which are usually adopted by Blob and passed off as his own. He also shows himself to be rather savvy about the conditions the team go through, to sometimes grim assumptions. Speaks with a thick Brummie accent.
Captain Crigg: The original commander of the Urpneys, a weak leader and cowardly excuse-maker. Crigg questioned Zordrak's leadership and frequently fell behind schedule, and so an enraged Zordrak dropped him into the Pit of No Return, where he was eaten by the Fraznats. Blob was then promoted into Crigg's place.
Argorribles: Ghostly purple clouds that Zordrak sends out each night to deliver nightmares to the sleeping world. The power of the Dreamstone is often far too much for them and so only occasionally do they slip through. However, with the power of the Nightmare stone, the Argorribles are powered up and are more likely to bypass the Dreamstone's defences. Though usually thwarted from making a full-scale attack on the Land Of Dreams, the Argorribles have a handful of large victories throughout the show's run. They are incorporeal, although one is briefly made solid in the episode "Horrible Argorrible".
Zarag (voiced by Jacqueline Clarke): Zordrak's sister, who was shut up in a bottle for five hundred years until accidentally being released by Nug. It is suggested in "Zarag" that she was once romantically involved with the Dream Maker, who claims she is incredibly clever, though also very vain. She also wants the Dreamstone, but to wear in her hair rather than to unleash nightmares on the unsuspecting world. Her last appearance was "The Substitute" where, in an arrangement with the Urpneys, she posed as a Dream Maker before the Noops, corrupting their dream bottles with Argoribbles and attempting to steal the stone. She appears to be more humanoid than her brother, though shares his ambitions and foul temper.
Frazznats: Creatures that live in the Pit of No Return and feed on Urpneys. They resemble a cross between a shark, a serpent and a Venus Flytrap, with lobster-like pincers.
Other Urpneys: Aside from the three main Urpney characters (four counting Urpgor), there were also a number of other Urpneys who occasionally had lines of dialogue, and a few of them were given names. These included Plug, the Urpney chef, and Blooge, Grid, Blit, Boff, Erk, and Sniff, all of whom were named in the third-series episode The Dream Beam Invasion.

Episodes

The Dreamstone aired between 1990 and 1995 with a total of 52 episodes. Each episode has a similar plot: Zordrak instructs his henchmen to steal the Dreamstone, which he plans to destroy so that nightmares will plague the sleeping world. The plan usually involves Urpgor, his right-hand man and scientist inventing some means with which the Urpneys, led by Sergeant Blob who is an archetypal Sergeant Major type, cross the Mist of Limbo (a vast Purple Mist) to get to the Land of Dreams. The plan invariably fails, the main problem being the cowardice and incompetence of the Urpneys.

Compared to the more tense and action-focused pilot episode, the rest of the show increasingly favoured more laid back, slapstick focused storylines. In earlier episodes, the lead heroes, Rufus and Amberley, usually had an underplayed role compared to the Urpneys and their own comrades, the Wuts and the Dream Maker, who often ultimately dealt with the Urpneys' schemes. Later episodes depict the Noops as more savvy and comedic characters, and expand the series' formula to give them more central focus, often tasked with an errand by the Dream Maker, while also trying to avoid the Urpneys' blundering interference. As such, the stories also started to branch into having new locales and characters get caught in the middle of the two sides' rivalry, over the usual transitioning between the two sides of the Sleeping World earlier on.

Soundtrack

The show was notable for its musical score, which is practically unique among cartoons in that it was performed by a full-size professional orchestra, namely the London Philharmonic Orchestra. The score, by Mike Batt, was heavily characterised by the use of leitmotifs and thematic variations, particularly on the two main songs used in the series, "Better Than a Dream" (characterising the Noops & Wuts) and "War Song of the Urpneys" (characterising the Urpneys).

Ozzy Osbourne, Frank Bruno, and Billy Connolly provided lead vocals on the "War Song of the Urpneys" single and album track, although the version heard in the series was largely sung by composer Mike Batt. Other artists who sang for The Dreamstone soundtrack included Bonnie Tyler, who recorded a duet with Mike entitled "Into The Sunset". This song was supposed to be used as the show's official love song (especially towards Rufus and Amberley), but it was never used in the show. Plus Joe Brown and Gary Glitter performed "The Vile Brothers Mountain Band", which was used on the show during the episode "Albert is Fishnapped".

The TV version of "Better Than A Dream" contained some different lyrics to the version included on the soundtrack. The TV version mostly reflected Rufus's personality, with the lyrics "I always dream myself to somewhere else each night" and "I know I dream much more than other people do". The soundtrack version contained "I used to dream myself to someone else each night" and "until I chanced upon this road that led to you", among a few other changes that were made to the song. Mike Batt also re-recorded the chorus, used in the ending credits from the latter part of Series 1 onwards until series 4, in which it was then shortened. In 2012, Katie Melua released a version of "Better Than A Dream".

The soundtrack was re-released as part of the Mike Batt Music Cube release in December 2009 by Dramatico Records. However, instead of the TV soundtrack, the CD features 5 newly recorded orchestral overtures, as well as "Better Than A Dream", "The War Song of the Urpneys", "Into the Sunset", and a shorter version of "The Dreamdance", which also omits the vocal clips from the show. "The Vile Brothers Mountain Band" was also omitted from the soundtrack due to controversy involving Gary Glitter.

TV soundtrack album listing (original release):
Better Than A Dream - Mike Batt (3:04)
The War Song Of The Urpneys - Billy Connolly, Ozzy Osbourne and Frank Bruno (4:44)
Dreamdance (Theme From The Dreamstone) (10:07)
Into The Sunset - Mike Batt and Bonnie Tyler (3:28)
The Vile Bros Mountain Band - Joe Brown and Gary Glitter (4:19)
The Dreamstone (Main Title) (2:10)
Wack's Wicks Works (2:15)
The Dream Maker (6:11)
Whirlyped Launch (5:21)
The Dreamstone Is Stolen (6:20)
The Argorribles And The Egg Of Death (6:48)
Rufus Succeeds (5:20)

TV soundtrack album listing (Music Cube re-release):
Better Than A Dream - Mike Batt (3:08)
The War Song of the Urpneys - Billy Connolly, Ozzy Osbourne and Frank Bruno (4:47)
Dreamdance (Edited Version) (4:53)
Into The Sunset - Mike Batt and Bonnie Tyler (3:32)
Dreamstone Overture no.1 (6:57)
Dreamstone Overture no.2 (4:48)
Dreamstone Overture no.3 (5:31)
Dreamstone Overture no.4 (4:49)
Dreamstone Overture no.5 (4:03)

This is not the only track to be called Dreamstone Overture no.5. On the "Better Than A Dream" 7-inch vinyl and CD single versions, there is another track entitled "Dreamstone Overture no.5". this version is different from the Music Cube re-release, in which it is actually an orchestral version of "Into The Sunset", while the Dreamstone Overtures on the Music Cube re-release are small selections of orchestral tracks from the original TV series, half used in a few episodes in Series 3 and 4. The "Dreamstone Overture no.5" that was present on the single ran for 6:48.

The Dreamstone soundtrack is currently out of print as of 2015. However, the 5 Overture tracks from the Music Cube re-release were included on Mike Batt's album A Classical Tale, released on CD on 24 July 2015 by Dramatico Records.

Home media releases and online distribution
In the United Kingdom, there were a few video releases from the Video Collection, covering all of series 1 (including the unedited opening special) except the episode "Megattack", plus several releases of most episodes (but not all of them) from Series 1 from Tring Video UK. BMG Video UK only released one video featuring 4 episodes of Series 2.

The first two episodes were originally combined to form the opening special which contained extra footage that was edited out from the 22-minute TV versions of the opening special. The first six episodes of this series have been released on DVD in the UK by Abbey Home Media when the rights of the show were owned by Cookie Jar Entertainment. These two volumes are now out of print. The company's old Jaroo website (now closed) used to stream the episodes with five episodes or less on the site at one time, though after five weeks an episode is removed from rotation until the process begins again. Jaroo only had access to the first two series.

There were 6 videos released by an Australian company called Reel Entertainment featuring the first 12 episodes of Series 3 released in 1997 only in Australia. There was also another video release, presumably of the first 3 episodes of Series 1 from Video Distributors International in 1992.

In the United States, Fisher Price released a single video of The Dreamstone.

Pidax Film released the first 13 episodes on DVD in Germany, with English & German audio, on 23 February 2018. Series 2 was released on 18 May 2018. Series 3 was released on 27 July 2018, and Series 4 was released on 28 September 2018.,

The first series was available in the UK through Amazon Prime, but it was missing the final episode of the series, "Megattack". Since the end of 2020, however, the episodes are currently no longer available on Amazon. iTunes has added the first 12 episodes onto their service.

In late 2018, Monster Entertainment started the "Official Dreamstone" channel on YouTube and has uploaded all 52 episodes on that channel. However, since June 2019, they set most of the episodes to "private". They are slowly making the other episodes available to view on the site. As of January 2020, they all have been re-uploaded.

In September 2022 this Series was onto the PZAZ TV Worldwide.

Production

Although the show was made in the United Kingdom, the cartoon itself was drawn in the Philippines. As with American produced cartoons, Martin Gates Productions used foreign studios for the overall animation work. Fil-Cartoons, owned by Hanna-Barbera, was utilized for series 1, while Moving Images International animated for series 2–4.

In 1985, Mike Jupp and Martin Gates produced a pilot for the series entitled The Dream Thief. It was animated by the studio Mill Valley Animation in Novato, California when Mike was working in America. In this short pilot, there were a few alterations to the TV series, most of which came from Jupp's original manuscript for the idea. The short also featured a 12-year-old Christian Bale as the voice of Rufus, whom Martin Gates would later work on with for Steven Spielberg's WWII film Empire of the Sun where Martin was the dialogue coach for Christian's character in his acting debut.

Merchandise and other media

In 1991, London Edition published a comic book series based on episodes from the cartoon. The first issue consisted entirely of screenshots, whilst the next five featured art that was drawn for the comics by Tim Perkins. The comics only ran six issues and took their plotlines straight from the following episodes: "The Dreamstone/Into Viltheed", "The Daydream Bubble", "Albert Is Fishnapped", "The Knitted Balloon", "The Shrinking Stone", and "The Invisible Blob".

BMI (Print Division) Ltd. released a board game based on The Dreamstone in 1993. The box proclaimed that it contained two games in one- The Dreamstone Game (involving rolling to move and collecting pieces of the Dreamstone) and Dream Chase (a variant on Snakes and Ladders). Neither were particularly original, and the game was not a best-seller. A jigsaw puzzle showing the Dream Maker, Rufus, Amberley, and Albert walking through the Noops' town was also produced, along with a few other puzzles produced by British puzzle/board game manufacturer Waddingtons.

In October 2019 Oakbound Studio announced that it was working on a licensed miniatures range and game based on The Dreamstone to mark the 30th anniversary of the show. The role-playing game, miniatures game, and a range of 27 initial collectable figurines based on the show were successfully funded through Kickstarter and released on the Oakbound website in July 2021. Zordrak himself has been announced as a second Kickstarter project launching in December 2022. A third miniatures release and supplement for the games is planned for 2022.

External links

TheDreamstone.org (formally The Ultimate Dreamstone Guide)
Nyanko's Dreamstone site

The Dreamstone at The Dream Videophile
The Dreamstone's page on Monster's official website
http://www.propworkshop.co.uk/dreamstone/ (Oakbound Studio's website)

References

1990 British television series debuts
1995 British television series endings
British children's animated fantasy television series
ITV children's television shows
Fox Broadcasting Company original programming
Fox Kids
English-language television shows
Television series by FilmFair
Television series by DHX Media
1990s British animated television series
Television series by ITV Studios
Television shows produced by Central Independent Television
Television shows produced by Scottish Television
1990s British children's television series